Electric Honey may refer to:

 Electric Honey (Partland Brothers album) (1986)
 Electric Honey (Luscious Jackson album) (1999)
 Electric Honey (label), a record label run by students at Stow College
 Pure Electric Honey, a 1990 album by Ant-Bee